100 greatest may refer to:

100 Greatest (TV series), a Channel 4 TV strand in the United Kingdom
100 Greatest African Americans, a biographical dictionary 
100 Greatest of All Time, a TV series ranking the greatest tennis players
100 Greatest Britons, a BBC TV programme
100 Greatest Discoveries, a TV series produced by THINKFilm for The Science Channel, hosted by Bill Nye
100 Greatest Greeks, part of the TV series Great Greeks
"The 100 Greatest Guitar Solos", a list compiled by magazine Guitar World
The 100 Greatest Metal Guitarists, a book by British author Joel McIver
100 Greatest Romanians, a TV programme
The Top 100 NHL Players of All-Time, by the magazine The Hockey News
The 100 Greatest NHL Players, the top 100 NHL players as chosen by members of the hockey community to commemorate the NHL's 100th anniversary
Atlantic Canada's 100 Greatest Books
The Australian rugby league's 100 greatest players
Historiens 100 viktigaste svenskar (The 100 Greatest Swedes), a book 
Time 100: The Most Important People of the Century, a compilation by Time magazine
The 100: A Ranking of the Most Influential Persons in History, a book
The Greatest (TV series)

See also
 Top 100 (disambiguation)